The Spanish missions in South America comprise a series of Jesuit Catholic religious outposts established by Spanish Catholics in order to spread the Christian doctrine among the local natives.

Missions

Argentina

 Mission San Ignacio Miní (1632), in Misiones Province
 Mission Nuestra Señora de Santa Ana (1637), in Misiones Province
 Mission Nuestra Señora de Loreto (1610), in Misiones Province
 Mission Santa María la Major (1626), in Misiones Province
 Mission Candelaria
 Mission Corpus
 Mission San Carlos
 Mission San José
 Mission Martires
 Mission San Javier
 Mission Conception
 Mission Apostoles
 Mission Santo Tomé
 Mission Yapeiu
 Mission La Cruz
 Jesuit Block and Estancias of Córdoba (1615), in Córdoba

Bolivia

 Mission San Javier
 Mission Concepción
 Mission San Ignacio de Velasco
 Mission Santa Ana de Velasco
 Mission San Miguel de Velasco
 Mission San Rafael de Velasco
 Mission San José de Chiquitos
 Mission Santiago de Chiquitos
 Mission San Juan Bautista
 Mission Santo Corazón
 Mission San Ignacio de Zamucos

Brazil
Missions in the Banda Oriental in southern Brazil.  The Banda Oriental was finally divided by the Treaty of San Ildefonso in 1777 between Spanish and Portuguese domains, the western portion becoming part of what is today state of Rio Grande do Sul, Brazil, the eastern portion becoming part of what is today Uruguay.
 Mission São Miguel das Missões (São Miguel Arcanjo) (1687), the chief mission of the seven in southern Brazil
 Mission Santo Ângelo (1706)
 Mission São Francisco de Borja (1682)
 Mission São Nicolau
 Mission São Luiz Gonzaga
 Mission São Lourenço Mártir (1690)
 Mission São João Batista (1697).
(Note: The above are Portuguese translations of the original names)

There were also 7 Spanish Missions (out of 30 or so in Viceroyalty of Peru east of the Andes)
constructed along tributaries in the Upper Solimoes area of what later became State of Amazonas, Brazil, between 1686 and 1689 by Jesuit Padre Samuel Fritz among the Omagua indigenous peoples.
Some of these were moved upstream into Peru due to pressure from the Bandeirantes slave raiders; the rest were destroyed by Portuguese forces between 1700 and 1711. 
 Mission San Joaquin de los Omagua, later moved upstream into Loreto, Peru
 Mission San Pablo, later São Paulo de Olivença
 Mission San Cristoval
 Mission San Francisco Xavier
 Mission Nuestra Señora de Guadalupe (Amazonas)
 Mission Traguatua
 mission de aldea pequenas (27 small villages constituting one mission)

Spanish missions in the lower Amazon:
 Mission San Pedro, later the Portuguese fort of Tabatinga
 Nuestra Señora de las Nieves de Yurimaguas

Paraguay
 Mission San Ignacio Guazù (1609)
 Mission Santa Rosa de Lima (1698)
 Mission Santa Maria da Fé (1647)
 Mission San Cosme y Damian (1652), also an astronomic observatory
 Mission Santiago (1651)
 Mission Itapua (present-day Encarnación)
 Mission Jesus de Tavarangué (1685)
 Mission La Santisima Trinidad de Paraná (1706), near present-day Encarnación

See also
 Jesuit Reductions
 Catholic Church and the Age of Discovery
 Spanish colonization of the Americas
 Guarani War
 The Mission (1986 film)

References

The Jesuit Missions in South America

 
Catholic Church in South America
History of South America
Spanish Colonial architecture